The Lebanese Heritage Museum is a museum in Jounieh, Lebanon. It contains objects related to the history and culture of Lebanon from the Phoenician era to modern times.

External links
 Lebanese Heritage Museum - Official webpage

History museums in Lebanon